The 1972 Equity Funding International, also known as the Washington Indoor, was a men's tennis tournament played on indoor carpet courts at the Georgetown University in Washington D.C. in the United States that was part of Group C of the 1972 Grand Prix circuit as well as of the 1972 USLTA Indoor Circuit. It was the inaugural edition of the tournament and was held  from March 6 through March 12, 1972. First-seeded Stan Smith won the singles title and earned $5,000 first-prize money.

Finals

Singles
 Stan Smith defeated  Jimmy Connors 6–3, 6–2, 6–7, 6–4
 It was Smith' 4th singles title of the year and the 40th of his career.

Doubles
 Cliff Richey /  Tom Edlefsen defeated  Clark Graebner /  Thomaz Koch 6–4, 6–3

References

External links
 ITF tournament edition details

Equity Funding International
Equity Funding International
Equity Funding International
1972 in sports in Washington, D.C.